Paulo Jorge Ferreira de Sousa (born 31 March 1967 in Vila Nova de Gaia, Porto District) is a Portuguese retired professional footballer who played as a right-back.

References

External links

1967 births
Living people
Sportspeople from Vila Nova de Gaia
Portuguese footballers
Association football defenders
Primeira Liga players
Liga Portugal 2 players
Segunda Divisão players
Leixões S.C. players
F.C. Maia players
Boavista F.C. players
C.F. União de Lamas players
F.C. Felgueiras players
Portugal international footballers